is a town located in Kanzaki District, Hyōgo Prefecture, Japan. , the town had an estimated population of 10,794 in 4220 households and a population density of 53 persons per km².

Geography 
Kamikawa is located in the center of Hyōgo Prefecture. Forests occupy about 80% of the town area, which is surrounded by 1,000-meter-class mountains. Mineyama and Tonomine Kogen are two of the leading plateau areas in the Kansai region. The settlements are scattered in the narrow valley bottom plains along the rivers such as the Odawara River, Ichi River, Ochi River, and Inumi River. The elevation near the Kamikawa Town Hall is 150 meters above sea level.

Neighbouring municipalities 
Hyōgo Prefecture
 Himeji
 Asago
 Shisō
 Ichikawa
 Taka

Climate
Kamikawa has a Humid subtropical climate (Köppen Cfa) characterized by warm summers and cool winters with light snowfall.  The average annual temperature in Kamikawa is 12.6 °C. The average annual rainfall is 1606 mm with September as the wettest month. The temperatures are highest on average in August, at around 24.4 °C, and lowest in January, at around 0.9 °C.

Demographics
Per Japanese census data, the population of Kamikawa has declined steadily over the 70 years.

History
The area of the modern town of Kamikawa was within ancient Harima Province. In the Edo Period, it was divided between Himeji Domain and tenryō territory under direct administration of the Tokugawa shogunate. Following the Meiji restoration, the villages of   Teramae and Hase were created within Kanzaki District, Hyōgo. The two villages merged on March 31, 1955 and attained town status as Ōkawachi. On April 1, 1957, Ōkawachi annexed the village of Ikuno from Asago District. Ōkawachi merged with the town of Kanzaki on November 7, 2005 and was renamed Kamikawa.

Government
Kamikawa has a mayor-council form of government with a directly elected mayor and a unicameral town council of 12 members. Kamikawa, together with the other municipalities of Kanzaki District, contributes one member to the Hyogo Prefectural Assembly. In terms of national politics, the town is part of Hyōgo 12th district of the lower house of the Diet of Japan.

Economy
Kamikawa has a mixed economy of agriculture and light manufacturing.

Education
Kamikawa has three public elementary schools and one public middle schools operated by the town government and one public high school operated by the Hyōgo Prefectural Department of Education.

Transportation

Railway
 JR West – Bantan Line
   -  -

Highway
  Bantan Renraku Road

References

External links

Kamikawa official website 

Towns in Hyōgo Prefecture
Kamikawa, Hyōgo